Peter Hakim (born c. 1942) is president emeritus and senior fellow of the Inter-American Dialogue, a Washington-based think tank on Western Hemisphere affairs. He served as president of the Dialogue from 1993 to 2010.

Professional 
Hakim writes and speaks widely on hemispheric issues, and has testified more than a dozen times before Congress. His articles have appeared in Foreign Affairs, Foreign Policy, The New York Times, The Washington Post, Miami Herald, Los Angeles Times, and Financial Times, and in newspapers and journals in Argentina, Brazil, Chile, Colombia, Mexico, Peru, and other Latin American nations. He is a regular guest on CNN, BBC, CBS, CNN en Español and other prominent news stations around the world. He wrote a monthly column for the Christian Science Monitor for nearly ten years, and now serves as a board member of Foreign Affairs Latinoamerica and editorial advisor to Americaeconomia, where he also publishes a regular column.

Background 
Hakim was a vice president of the Inter-American Foundation and worked for the Ford Foundation in New York and Latin America (in Argentina, Brazil, Chile and Peru). He has taught at MIT and Columbia University. He has served on boards and advisory committees for the World Bank, Council on Competitiveness, Inter-American Development Bank, Canadian Foundation for Latin America (FOCAL), Partners for Democratic Change, and Human Rights Watch. He is a member of the Council on Foreign Relations.

Education 
Hakim earned a B.A. at Cornell University (1964), an M.S. in Physics at the University of Pennsylvania, and a Master of Public and International Affairs at Princeton University’s Woodrow Wilson School.

References

External links 
 Hakim profile on Inter-American Dialogue website
 Video (with mp3 available) of discussion with Hakim on Bloggingheads.tv
 

21st-century American economists
American foreign policy writers
American male non-fiction writers
American people of Lebanese descent
1940s births
Living people
Princeton School of Public and International Affairs alumni
Cornell University alumni
University of Pennsylvania alumni
Members of the Inter-American Dialogue